The Bern Switzerland Temple (formerly the Swiss Temple) is a temple of the Church of Jesus Christ of Latter-day Saints (LDS Church), was the church's first temple built in Europe, and the first built outside of North America.

History

The architects were Edward O. Anderson and Wilhelm Zimmer. Groundbreaking and dedication of the lot were performed by McKay on 5 August 1953. He dedicated the temple on 11 September 1955. The temple was known as the "Swiss Temple" until the current naming convention for temples was adopted in the late 1990s.

Its temple district includes stakes in France, Switzerland, and the district in Jerusalem, Israel.

The presentation of the endowment was particularly challenging in this temple, because it was the first international one, requiring many different languages for its attendants. It was solved by using a film, dubbed in all required languages. Gordon B. Hinckley supervised the initial making of this film and was the person responsible for transporting the film to Switzerland.  Since then all new temples have been equipped with recordings in lieu of live presentations by temple workers. Today, only the Manti Utah Temple and the Salt Lake Temple use live presentation instead of film (although the church announced in 2021 that these temples will convert to use of film after extensive remodeling).

After the complete renewal of the interior, the temple was rededicated by Hinckley, who was then a member of church's First Presidency, on 23 October 1992. In connection with the fiftieth anniversary of its dedication, a  statue of the angel Moroni was erected on top of the tower on 7 September 2005.

In 2020, like all the church's other temples, the Bern Switzerland Temple was closed in response to the coronavirus pandemic.

The Bern Switzerland temple is featured briefly in the Woodkid music videos for "Iron" and "Run Boy Run". Though the building is located in Münchenbuchsee, its postal address is assigned to the neighboring municipality of Zollikofen.

See also

 Comparison of temples of The Church of Jesus Christ of Latter-day Saints
 List of temples of The Church of Jesus Christ of Latter-day Saints
 List of temples of The Church of Jesus Christ of Latter-day Saints by geographic region
 Temple architecture (Latter-day Saints)
 The Church of Jesus Christ of Latter-day Saints in Switzerland

References

External links

 Bern Switzerland Temple Official site
 Bern Switzerland Temple at ChurchofJesusChristTemples.org

20th-century Latter Day Saint temples
Buildings and structures in the canton of Bern
Temples in Switzerland
Religious buildings and structures completed in 1955
Temples (LDS Church) in Europe
The Church of Jesus Christ of Latter-day Saints in Switzerland
1955 establishments in Switzerland
20th-century architecture in Switzerland